Beaver Brook Reservation is a public recreation area covering  on the dividing line between the town of Belmont and the city of Waltham, Massachusetts. The state park is managed by the Massachusetts Department of Conservation and Recreation.

History
Created in 1893, the state park was the first reservation established by the Metropolitan Park Commission. Its primary purpose was to protect a stand of 22 white oak trees known as the Waverly Oaks, which had been defended from destruction by landscape architect Charles Eliot. The last of the ancient trees succumbed to old age in the 1920s. A portion of the reservation was owned by the landscape architect Robert Morris Copeland (1830-1874), whose 19th-century home sits within the park. Other points of historical interest include a monument to the Waverly Oaks and the remains of a 19th-century fulling mill.

Activities and amenities
In addition to a bike path, playing fields, woodlands, wetlands, a cascading waterfall, wading pool, and fishing opportunities, the reservation offers programs on wildlife and cultural history. Restrooms and a tot lot are also available.

References

External links

Beaver Brook Reservation Department of Conservation and Recreation

Belmont, Massachusetts
State parks of Massachusetts
Parks in Middlesex County, Massachusetts
Protected areas established in 1893
1893 establishments in Massachusetts